The Cirata Dam is an embankment dam on the Citarum River in West Java, Indonesia. It was constructed between 1984 and 1988 for the primary purpose of hydroelectric power generation. Other purposes include flood control, aquaculture, water supply and irrigation. The dam's power station is located on the north side of the river bend and contains eight 126 MW Francis turbine-generators. It has a total installed capacity of 1,008 MW and an annual generation of 1,426 GWh. The power station was completed in two phases, the second was completed in 1998. It serves mostly as a peaking power plant and is the largest hydroelectric power station in Indonesia. The construction of the dam resulted in involuntary resettlement of 56,000 people.

See also

List of power stations in Indonesia 
List of conventional hydroelectric power stations

References

purwakarta Regency
Dams in Indonesia
Hydroelectric power stations in Indonesia
Concrete-face rock-fill dams
Dams completed in 1988
Infrastructure in Indonesia
Lakes of Java
Landforms of West Java
Reservoirs in Indonesia